Oleg Kroshkin (1950 - 2020) was a contemporary Belarusian artist. He was among the most iconic representatives of the modern Vitebsk art school, each of whom has distinctive way of incorporating urban life into the fabric of their pictorial narratives.

Biography 
Born in 1950 in Sokol-Dolinsky village in Russia, Kroshkin died in the city of Vitebsk, Belarus, 7 November 2020. Kroshkin graduated from the art and graphic department of the Vitebsk State Art Institute in 1972. He regularly exhibited his works since 1971.

Kroshkin was a member of the Union of Artists of the USSR, and from 1991, a member of the Belarusian Union of Artists. His works were characterized by appeals to pop art and urban folklore, bright colors, the incorporation of collage, and ironic use of images. In his works Kroshkin relied on postmodern thought, anti-traditionalism, written quotation, and the use of various artistic languages and techniques.

Artistry 
1970-1990 He searched for himself.

1990-2005 He found himself.

2010-2020 He lost himself.

Oleg Kroshkin had a unique position amongst his peers of the second school of Vitebsk, the first being École de Paris members Marc Chagall, Chaïm Soutine, Michel Kikoine, Pinchus Kremegne, Ossip Zadkine, Jacques Lipchitz, and Ossip Lubitch—all from Belarus. Despite insecurities that otherwise plagued artists, Oleg Kroshkin had already built a heady and successful stature as a Pop Art Artist, having his works in Tretyakov Gallery, New Brunswick New Jersey, New York City, and Koln museums, with international collectors queuing for his works. He was frequently morose, even feeling deep emotion when having completed an artwork. His life and work embodied contradictions as he was driven to succeed, yet often tried to resolve his anxieties with alcohol.

His personality was one to rebel violently against mediocrity, which caused him irritation and unpredictable panic in his life. Myths, facts, fiction in Kroshkin's life and work, there was room for spiritual transformation, ingenuity, obscene money, indifferent disdain for and denunciation of oppression, coupled with readiness to hold power up to ridicule, with a lot of creativity. He listened to pop music, rap and jazz and he worked here and there on sketch papers, while he also incorporated current newspapers into his canvasses.

He used his creativity to amuse, and had a buffoon's instinct as a creative genius. And yet his genius was coupled with chronic self-loathing, especially after his brother, returning from Moscow, died after visiting him. After his brother's death, he lost interest in painting and fell into a period of decline. Despite some prominent works, his art essentially dimmed along with him, and ultimately blinking out with his death in October 2020. He had sometimes terrible bouts of depression with flashes of exceptional creativity in his pop art  pieces, which provided him some consolation.

His fitful absences from painting however, gradually led him to repetition or variations of classic drip works in his art. His paintings display great bursts of shameless, ambitious excess mixed with frustration and anger. Kroshkin's works demonstrated sarcasm, love, family, sex, religion and oppression, which he considered extremely important.

Museums 

 Belarusian National Arts Museum (Minsk, Belarus)
 Marc Chagall Museum (Vitebsk, Belarus)
 Tretyakov Gallery (Russia)
 New Brunswick Museum (USA)
 Museum of Modern Art (Frankfurt)
 The funds of the Belarusian Union of Artists

Exhibitions

Group exhibitions 

 1988 – international exhibition, Kaunas (Lithuanian SSR)
 1991 – international exhibition «The Artists from Malevich and Chagall’s Motherland», (Poland).
 1992 – republican exhibition (Literary Museum of М. Bogdanovich), Minsk.
 1997 – international exhibition «Vitebsk Watercolours», Wetzlar (Germany).
 2003 – international open-air «PANODERAMA», Frankfurt on the Oder (Germany).
 2014 – international exhibition «Poetry of Colour», Moscow (Russia)

Personal exhibitions 

 1995 – an exhibition of watercolors (Vitebsk Art Museum), Vitebsk.
 2005 – personal exhibition «Painting, graphics, collage» (exhibition hall of the CE «Museum «Vitebsk Centre of Modern Art»), Vitebsk (60 works).
 2008 – an exhibition of Vitebsk artists «From Marc Chagall’s to Our Time».
 2010 – exhibition «ART-season-2010» (exhibition hall of the CE «Museum «Vitebsk Centre of Modern Art»), Vitebsk.
 2012 – exhibition of works exhibition of the works «Fine Gift, Invaluable Gift», granted to Vitebsk Art Museum (Vitebsk Art Museum), Vitebsk.
 2014 – personal exhibition «Cherchez la femme» (M. Chagall Art Centre), Vitebsk (37 works).
 2016 – personal exhibition «Music of Colour» (concert hall «Vitebsk»), Vitebsk.
 2017 – exhibition «ABSTRAKT» (exhibition hall of the CE «Museum «Vitebsk Centre of Modern Art»), Vitebsk.

Major works

References 

1950 births
2020 deaths
Belarusian artists
20th-century Belarusian painters
Belarusian male painters
20th-century male artists
Contemporary painters
Male painters